Trapped! is a 2007–2010 children's dark fantasy-themed adventure game show that was broadcast on BBC channels from 28 September 2007 to 4 November 2010.

Plot 
The show is set in a dark, six-floor fictional tower with windows which, from the opening titles, is situated on a small island in the middle of the ocean. Every episode is introduced by "The Caretaker" (Simon Greenall), a former world traveller who only came there for one good night's sleep, but he was imprisoned there by "The Voice" (performed by Eve Karpf and Faith Brown). To (eventually) earn his freedom, the Caretaker must trap as many children (referred to in the programme as "Unfortunates") as the Voice personally deems worthy.

Six human children compete on each episode and are brought to the tower by another captive, "Wiley Sneak" (Physically Portrayed by Olly Pike). Locked in a cage and winced up by The Caretaker via a simple wheel and pully system, the children begin at the top of the tower and must journey down to the bottom; one child is eliminated or "trapped" on each floor, and the last one remaining receives the "Key of Freedom" and escapes. Sequestered in the attic, the Caretaker occasionally offers English commentary and orders while viewing  the events through his "Watch Tank," a big and delicate globe mounted within a frame that gives a 360° overhead view of the relevant portion of the tower.

Trapped! (2007–2009)
Each contestant is given an earpiece receiver, or "Whisper Clip," that they must wear during the competition. Each floor of the tower poses a different challenge to the team, demonstrated by Wiley while the Caretaker provides instructions through both live commentary and pre-recorded voiceover. Before each challenge begins, one contestant is informed by The Voice, via their Whisper Clip that they have been chosen to act as a "Saboteur," and must try to make the team fail without being detected by the others. Throughout each task, The Voice guides the Saboteur via the Whisper Clip attached to their ear, advising them of the best way to successfully sabotage each task.

If the team passes the challenge, the Saboteur becomes trapped on that floor and the others move down through the tower. If the team fails, each contestant casts one vote as to the Saboteur's identity; the one who receives the most votes becomes trapped, whether or not they were the Saboteur. A "draw straws" box is used in the event of a tie, and the one who draws the shortest straw is trapped.

The last two contestants compete in "The Fight for Freedom," a timed quiz consisting of alternating questions that tests their recall of the events of the episode. When time runs out, the high scorer wins the game and uses the Key of Freedom to leave the tower.

Trapped!: Ever After (2010)

For 2010, changes were made to the format of the programme, particularly in areas of themes, the games and interaction with the Unfortunates. Introducing a brand new attic for the Caretaker, recaps were made of previously trapped unfortunates on higher floors of the tower and the appearance of the Voice was revised. The final round was revised to put both contestants in a best-of-seven Q&A round, represented by a four-step path toward the Key of Freedom; a correct answer allowed a contestant to advance one step, while a miss allowed the opponent to do so. The first one to reach the Key became the winner. In the cases of both contestants being one step away, one of them must answer their question correctly first. If both are wrong, it keeps on going until someone gets it right.

Music
The music is written by Dobs Vye, a composer who specialises in writing for television.

Cast and crew

Voice cast
Simon Greenall as The Caretaker (all episodes)
Eve Karpf as The Voice (Series 1 only)
Faith Brown as The Voice (Series 2–4)
Olly Pike as Wiley Sneak (all episodes)
Helen Evans as Madame Deux Visage, Miss Mutternot, Ethel the Witch and Crowman
Eloise Dale as Midnight Bride and Frozen Princess
Sophie-Louise Dann as Evil Granny
Jolana Lee as Split Ends
Dusty Limits as The Marriage Man
Djalenga Scott as Esmé the Creature Transformer and Scarlett the Wolf Hunter
Kiran Shah as The Grimble
Peter Wardell as The One-Eyed Watcher and Boris the Organist
Leisha Wickham as Millicent
Brian Wheeler as the Baby Botherer
Matthew Wren as the Moonhowler

Crew
Director – James Morgan
Producer and Creator – Rob Hyde
Writers – Carl Carter and Tony Cooke
Art Director – Catherine Land
Set Design – Richard Drew
Lighting Director – James Campbell

Challenges 
Trapped! incorporates two different types of challenges (excluding the Fight for Freedom): timed challenges, where the Unfortunates must work together to complete a challenge during a set time limit, usually around 90 seconds to 2 minutes, and mental challenges, where persuasion and the ability to influence others' decision making is tested. Throughout the series, there are 38 unique challenges used (39 if including Fight for Freedom).

Timed Challenges 

 Black Widow (First played: Series 1, Episode 1 - "Poplar", Last played: Series 1, Episode 11 - "Liverpool", Played on Floor 6): In this challenge, Unfortunates must suck up white balls, described as spider eggs, using vacuum hoses within 90 seconds. The Saboteur would have to sneakily suck up yellow eggs, described as Black Widows, which would make more eggs fall from the ceiling, making the challenge more difficult to complete. This challenge was played 4 times.
 Wall of Sorrow (First played: Series 1, Episode 3 - "Cambridge", Last played: Series 3, Episode 10 - "Hackney", Played on Floor 6): In this physical challenge, the unfortunates must build "the wall of sorrow" using all 80 bricks provided, and must complete the wall within 90 seconds. Periodically, there will be "blackouts", giving the Saboteur an opportunity to destroy the wall. This challenge was played 8 times.
 Goblet of Ice (First played: Series 1, Episode 4 - "Ipswich", Last played: Series 3, Episode 13 - "Bolton", Played on Floor 6): In this challenge, the unfortunates have just 90 seconds to carry cups of powered snow into a goblet whilst travelling over slippery stepping stones. Slipping and stepping on the floor will cause the goblet to tip up, erasing progress. This challenge was played 6 times.
 Body Shock (First played: Series 2, Episode 1 - "Wolverhampton", Last played: Series 3, Episode 11 - "Leeds", Played on Floor 6): During the challenge, Unfortunates must complete a body using parts around the room within 2 minutes. During that time, there will be blackouts, allowing the Saboteur to release the Botherers, two men behind a cage who will destroy the body. To pass, the body must be complete and the Botherers must be locked in their cage. The challenge was played 9 times.
 Poisoned Harvest (First played: Series 2, Episode 2 - "Watford", Last played: Series 3, Episode 7 - "Eastbourne", Played on Floor 6): In this challenge, Unfortunates must collect red and yellow "Weedle Berries" into each others baskets, which they carry on their backs, for 2 minutes. However, the saboteur is tasked with contaminating those baskets with poison berries, which are purple. Contaminating two or more baskets with purple poisoned weedle berries results in failure. The challenge was played 4 times.
 Giant Appetite (First played: Series 3, Episode 1 - "Brixton", Last played: Series 3, Episode 12 - "Glasgow", Played on Floor 6):
 Freaky Factory (First played: Series 1, Episode 2 - "Willesden", Played on Floor 5):

Mental Challenges 
 Toxic Treats (First played: Series 1, Episode 2 - "Willesden", Played on Floor 6):
 Feed Me Lies (First played: Series 1, Episode 1 - "Poplar", Played on Floor 5): In this challenge, the Unfortunates are confronted with two sentient plants: Phyllis and Madge. During the challenge, players will place a seed from a bag under the magnifying glass in front of Phyllis, who will then read aloud the statement on it. The group then must decide if the statement is a truth or a lie and feed said seed to the corresponding plant (Phyllis for truth and Madge for lies). If the players feed the right plant 3 times, they'll pass. If they feed the wrong plant 3 times they'll fail.  
 Snake Attack
Deadly Medley (First played: Series 1, Episode 4 - "Ipswich", Played on Floor 5):
 Fairy Trails (First played: Series 2, Episode 4 - "Castleford", Played on Floor 5):

Transmissions

See also 
 The Mole, the ABC show with a similar premise, later revived on Netflix

References

External links
 
 

British children's game shows
BBC children's television shows
2007 British television series debuts
2010 British television series endings
CBBC shows
British children's fantasy television series
Television series by BBC Studios
English-language television shows
Television about fairies and sprites
Witchcraft in television
Television about werewolves